Henri Louis Dekking (7 February 1892 – May 1967) was a Dutch bobsledder. He competed in the four-man event at the 1928 Winter Olympics.

Dekking started with bobsleigh just one winter before the 1928 Winter Olympics. In that time he did it for four consecutive months; seen at the time as a long period. At the 1928 Winter Olympics in Saint Moritz he was part of the first Dutch bobsleigh team in the four-man event (the Dutch didn't participate in 1924) together with Curt van de Sandt (captain), Hubert Menten, Edwin Louis Teixeira de Mattos and Jacques Delprat. The Dutch team finished 8th in the first run and finished 12th overall after the second run.

References

1892 births
1967 deaths
Dutch male bobsledders
Olympic bobsledders of the Netherlands
Bobsledders at the 1928 Winter Olympics
Sportspeople from Haarlem